Marc Pallemaerts (4 September 1960 - 2 May 2014) was a Belgian environmental lawyer. From 2012 to 2014, he was United Nations Special Rapporteur on Toxics and Human Rights.

Life 
He graduated from Vrije Universiteit Brussel and Harvard University. He was a professor at  Vrije Universiteit Brussel (VUB), Université Libre de Bruxelles (ULB), and  University of Amsterdam. He was a Senior Fellow at Institute for European Environmental Policy. He was a member of the committee of the Kyoto Protocol.

Works 

 Toxics and Transnational Law, Hart Publishing, 2003

References 

1960 births
2014 deaths
Environmental lawyers
Vrije Universiteit Brussel alumni
Harvard Law School alumni
Academic staff of the Université libre de Bruxelles
Academic staff of the University of Amsterdam